Levelling the Land is the second full-length album by the Brighton folk-punk group, The Levellers, released in 1991. The album reached number 14 in the UK album charts and has since gained platinum status through ongoing sales. The original album pressing contained ten tracks but following the success of the single "Fifteen Years", which peaked at #11 on the UK charts in May 1992, the song was added as track three to later pressings.

This was the first Levellers album to feature the input of Simon Friend as songwriter, vocalist and musician. He replaced Alan Miles, who had sung and played guitar and mandolin on the previous album, A Weapon Called the Word. "Liberty Song" on this album was co-written by Miles.

Track listing
 All band members are given writing credits on all the tracks.
"One Way" – 4:08
"The Game" – 3:28
"Fifteen Years" – 3:11 (not on initial pressing)
"The Boatman" – 5:56
"Liberty Song" – 4:29 (co-written by original member Alan Miles)
"Far From Home" - 3:22
"Sell Out" – 4:17
"Another Man's Cause" – 4:35
"The Road" – 4:00
"The Riverflow" – 3:02
"Battle of the Beanfield" – 3:41

The 2007 re-issue of the album also included the bonus tracks:
"Last Days of Winter"
"Dance Before the Storm"
"Hard Fight"
"The Devil Went Down to Georgia"
"Plastic Jeezus"

A bonus live disc was recorded at Glastonbury in 1992:
"The Game"
"World Freak Show" (co-written by original member Alan Miles)
"Dance Before the Storm"
"The Boatman"
"Far From Home"
"Sell Out"
"The Riverflow"
"Battle of the Beanfield"
"Jig/Three Friends"
"Liberty Song"
"One Way"
"The Devil Went Down to Georgia"

Personnel
 Mark Chadwick - lead vocals, guitars, harmonica
 Simon Friend - backing vocals, lead vocals on tracks 4 and 11, guitars, mandolin, banjo, harmonica
 Jeremy Cunningham - bass guitar, album artwork
 Jonathan Sevink - fiddle
 Charlie Heather - drums/percussion
 Alan Scott - producer

References

1991 albums
Levellers (band) albums
China Records albums